Mírzá Asadu'lláh Fádil Mázandarání (1881–1957) was a prominent Baháʼí scholar in Iran. He travelled to Iraq, India and North America at the request of ʻAbdu'l-Bahá and Shoghi Effendi (the second and third leaders of the Baháʼí Faith), to spread the Baháʼí teachings.

He had three sons, two from first marriage and one from second marriage.

Works
He wrote the Zuhúru'l-Haqq (History of the Manifestation of Truth), a nine volume history of the Bábí and Baháʼí religions and the Asráru'l-áthár (1932-1943),. a five volume Bábí-Baháʼí dictionary (1967-1972). He also has published a four volume collection called Amr wa khalq, containing selections from the Bahá'í writings related to philosophical, theological, religious, and administrative matters (1954-1974).

See also
 Mírzá Abu'l-Faḍl (1844–1914)
 ʻAbdu'l-Hamíd Ishráq-Khávari (1902–1972)
 Adib Taherzadeh (1921–2000)

References

External links
 Amr va Khalq, 4 volumes
 Amr va Khalq (Command and Creation),  translation of index and catalog of contents 
 The State When Asleep: Dreams, Their Interpretation and Wisdom, translation of extracts from Amr va Khalq.
 Tarikh-i Zuhur Al-Haqq (The History of Truth Manifest), nine volumes on Bábí and Bahá'í history, hand-typed and proofread 
 H-Bahai: Collected Works of Fadil Mazandarani
 From a talk by Jinab-i-Fadil Mazandarani: Seven Cities in the Spiritual Journey to God
 Transcribed copies of talks given by Jinab-i-Fadil during his trips to the United States in the early 1920s

Iranian Bahá'ís
19th-century Bahá'ís
Iranian scholars
1880 births
1957 deaths